Jane Slaughter (born 1961) is a British actress. She is known for portraying the background role of Tracey in BBC soap opera EastEnders. Slaughter has portrayed Tracey since the initial episode of EastEnders on 19 February 1985, making her the longest serving character on the show, with no breaks or temporary exits.

Life and career
As a child, Slaughter trained at Elmhurst Ballet School. She made her debut television appearance as Petrova in Ballet Shoes in 1975, and in 1976, she appeared as Bella in three episodes of Katy. In 1981, she portrayed the role of Joanna in The History Man.

In 1985, Slaughter began portraying the role of Tracey in the BBC soap opera EastEnders. In an interview with Radio Times, she stated "As a child, I was lucky and worked continually. Then I got in to my late teens and I lost my way. I wanted to play it safe, didn’t want to be brave, and never made that leap to adult actress." Slaughter is currently the longest serving character on EastEnders, since Adam Woodyatt left the show in 2021.

Personal life
Slaughter has two sons.

Filmography

References

External links
 

Living people
English television actresses
English soap opera actresses
People educated at the Elmhurst School for Dance
1961 births